Longiantrum legraini is a moth of the family Erebidae first described by Michael Fibiger in 2010. It is known from Thailand.

The wingspan is about 10 mm. The head, patagia, anterior part of the tegulae, prothorax, basal part of the costa, and costal part of the medial area are blackish brown. The costal medial area is narrowly quadrangular. The forewing ground colour is dark brown throughout, including the fringes. The crosslines are diffuse and beige. The terminal line is marked by black interneural dots. The hindwing is light grey and the fringes beige. The underside of the forewing is light brown, while the underside of the hindwing is light grey.

References

Micronoctuini
Taxa named by Michael Fibiger
Moths described in 2010